Aglaothorax is a genus of ovate shieldbacks in the family Tettigoniidae. There are about six described species in Aglaothorax.

Species
These six species belong to the genus Aglaothorax:
 Aglaothorax diminutiva (Rentz & Birchim, 1968) i c g b (diminutive shieldback)
 Aglaothorax gurneyi (Rentz & Birchim, 1968) i c g b (Gurney's shieldback)
 Aglaothorax longipennis (Rentz & Weissman, 1981) i c g b (Malibu shieldback)
 Aglaothorax morsei (Caudell, 1907) i c g b (Morse's shieldback)
 Aglaothorax ovata (Scudder, 1899) i c g b (ovate shieldback)
 Aglaothorax propsti (Rentz and Weissman, 1981) i c g
Data sources: i = ITIS, c = Catalogue of Life, g = GBIF, b = Bugguide.net

References

Further reading

 
 

Tettigoniinae